Convention Hall was a convention center in Kansas City, Missouri that hosted the 1900 Democratic National Convention and 1928 Republican National Convention.

It was designed by Frederick E. Hill and built at the corner of 13th and Central and cost $225,000 and opened on February 22, 1899 with a performance by the John Philip Sousa band.

It was destroyed in a fire on April 4, 1900,  Kansas City was scheduled to host the Democratic National Convention over July 4.  Hill redesigned a new hall that would be fireproof and it was built in 90 days in an effort that was called "Kansas City Spirit."  A local 16-year-old Democrat, Harry S. Truman, served as a page at the convention.

During the flood of 1903, the hall housed several thousand refugees. The final 110 refugees were sent to tent camps at 31st and Summit. The hall had to be fumigated after their departure on June 12th, 1903. 

The world's largest pipe organ, which became the nucleus of Philadelphia's Wanamaker Organ was originally planned for the north end of the hall after it was exhibited as the centerpiece of Festival Hall at the Louisiana Purchase Exposition of 1904. The Kansas City hall operators backed out of the contract before installation when it was discovered the document had never legally been ratified.

The hall hosted the 1928 Republican Convention and was torn down in 1936 when it became a parking lot for the new Municipal Auditorium.

The hall hosted various traveling events including a Sarah Bernhardt performance of Camille.  Its most controversial use was hosting a series of Ku Klux Klan rallies in 1922–1924.

References

External links
UMKC history of hall
Truman Library history of the hall
Menwhomadekansascity.com profile

Buildings and structures in Kansas City, Missouri
Economy of Kansas City, Missouri
Convention centers in Missouri
Buildings and structures demolished in 1936
Demolished buildings and structures in Missouri